The Lithuanian Armed Forces are the military of Lithuania. The Lithuanian Armed Forces consist of the Lithuanian Land Forces, the Lithuanian Naval Force and the Lithuanian Air Force. In wartime, the Lithuanian State Border Guard Service (which is under the supervision of the Ministry of the Interior in peacetime) becomes part of the Lithuanian Armed Forces. A special security department handles VIP protection and communications security.

The purpose of the Lithuanian Armed Forces are to be the principal deterrent against any security threat to the nation. Lithuania's defence system is based on the concept of "total and unconditional defence" mandated by Lithuania's National Security Strategy. The goal of Lithuania's defence policy is to prepare their society for general defence and to integrate Lithuania into Western security and defence structures. The Ministry of National Defence is responsible for combat forces, search and rescue, and intelligence operations.

Male conscription is in place since 2015, when it was reinstated after being ended in 2008, due to concerns about the geopolitical environment in light of the Russo-Ukrainian War.

In early 2022, Lithuania's defence budget for 2022 was approximately €1.05 billion, but it was increased to €1.5 billion on 17 March 2022.

History

Grand Ducal Lithuanian Army 

The Lithuanian military originates in the Grand Ducal Lithuanian Army, active from the 13th century to 1795. After the Union of Lublin in 1569, the Lithuanian Army remained equal to the Polish Crown army in the military of the Polish–Lithuanian Commonwealth until the Third Partition in 1795. The Grand Ducal Lithuanian Army fought in many major battles, such as the Battle of Blue Waters (1362/63), Battle of Grunwald (1410), Battle of Orsha (1514) and Battle of Kircholm (1605).

Similarly to other medieval European states, the army was raised by the nobility during the Late Middle Ages. By the 17th century, it was mostly outclassed by professional forces and a standing army was instituted.

13th century 
From the 12th century's end and into the 13th century, Lithuania frequently went to war against the western and southwestern Rus' states, Kingdom of Galicia-Volhynia and Duchy of Masovia, while also devastating lands along the Daugava and elsewhere. From the early 1200s, Lithuanians fought against the Swordbrothers, from 1237 against the Livonian Order, and from the 13th century's second half against the State of the Teutonic Order. While fighting on Lithuania's northern and western frontiers was unceasing, the Lithuanian state expanded southwards and eastwards during the Late Middle Ages. The Lithuanian army was mobile as it had to fight on many fronts, like with the State of the Teutonic Order to the west, the Livonian Order to the north, the Golden Horde and it's vassal Muscovy to the east, and the Tatar khanates to the south. According to 13th-century sources, Lithuanian soldiers were mounted when going on military expeditions but fought on foot, arranged in three rows during battles. The best-armed and most experienced fought in the front, while the least experienced and lightly armed were in the last row. Furthermore, the Lithuanians were skilled at fighting using spears, especially on horseback, and the earliest written mention of such tactics dates to 1208 when Lithuanians, riding on horses, threw spears into their enemies.

Although the Germans initially had superior weaponry during the 13th century, the Lithuanians won the Battles of Saule (1236), Durbe (1260), Karuse (1270), Aizkraukle (1279) and many others. However, Lithuanians were less successful against enemy fortifications, especially brick castles. Eventually, the battle front lines stabilised over time, with the one against the Livonian Order more or less following the modern Latvia–Lithuania border, while the one against the Teutonic Order being close to the Nemunas. The Lithuanian side of the border had a castle system along the river.

14th century 
Over the 14th century, the Teutonic and Livonian orders organised raids into Lithuania. Lithuanians responded by raiding their respective territories, however, the Lithuanian raids were numerically fewer. The Lithuanians won the Battle of Medininkai (1320), but lost the Battle of Strėva (1348). More and more, the Teutonic Order destroyed the Lithuanian castle system along the Nemunas and built their castles near the Lithuanian ones. As the German and Livonian orders were constantly reinforced by Christian European countries, it became increasingly difficult to defend Lithuania solely by military means. Hence, the new generation of the Lithuanian Grand Dukes Jogaila and Vytautas the Great used not only military, but also diplomatic and political means, e.g. Lithuanian baptism in 1387, to protect Lithuania.

Simultaneously, on the other side of the Lithuanian state, the Golden Horde's army was destroyed in the Battle of Blue Waters (1362-1363). In 1368, 1370, and 1372, the Lithuanian Grand Duke Algirdas led the Grand Ducal Lithuanian Army into military expeditions against Muscovy. However, the Battle of the Vorksla River (1399) was a decisive victory for the Golden Horde.

15th century 
Finally, the German Teutonic Order was crushed in the Battle of Grunwald (1410) (known as Battle of Žalgiris in Lithuanian historiography), which was the largest Middle Age battle in Central and Eastern Europe. In this key battle, the Lithuanian Army was led by Vytautas the Great. Under him, the Lithuanian Army attacked the lands of the Republics of Pskov, in 1426, and Novgorod, in 1428. The Grand Duchy of Lithuania had internal civil wars in the first half of the 15th century.  The Lithuania Army engaged in biological warfare already in 1422, when it catapulted manure made from infected victims into an opposing Bohemian town as part of the Hussite Wars. In 1435, Sigismund Kęstutaitis' army defeated the opposing army, which included troops of the Livonian Order, led by Švitrigaila in the Battle of Wiłkomierz.

16th century 
This century was marked by war of Lithuania against Muscovy and the Crimean Khanate. In the wars with the latter, the Lithuanians won the Battle of Kletsk in 1506. With the strengthening of the Grand Duchy of Moscow from the late 15th century, there were unceasing wars over Lithuania's eastern territories. In 1514, during the fourth war, the Lithuanians triumphed over the numerically larger Muscovite army in the famous Battle of Orsha. However, due to the unfavourable military situation, Lithuania lost a part of its eastern lands, most importantly the strategically important fortress of Smolensk. The Grand Ducal Lithuanian Army fought against Muscovy in the Livonian War, winning against the Muscovite army, twice the Lithuanian army's size, in the Battle of Ula in 1564. Three years into the Livonian War, Livonia became part of Lithuania in 1561 with the Treaty of Vilnius. During this war, the Union of Lublin was made in 1569. In the late 1570s and early 1580s, the Lithuanian and Polish armies cooperated in Stephen Báthory's incursions into Russia.

17th century 
The 17th century was marked by wars against Sweden, the Tsardom of Muscovy and the Ottoman Empire. The Lithuanian army, together with the Polish army, fought against the Ottoman forces, notably at both Battles of Khotyn in 1621 and 1673. During the war with Sweden from 1600 to 1629, the Lithuanian army defeated the three times larger Swedish forces at the Battle of Kircholm in 1605. However, this war highlighted the Commonwealth's weakness in recruiting and retaining a sufficient number of troops, better arming its soldiers with firearms and bettering their use. Following the war with Sweden, a significant part of Livonia was seized by them as part of Swedish Livonia. During the 17th century's first half, Smolensk returned to Lithuania following the Smolensk War.

The Commonwealth's military weakness in the middle and late 17th century was evidenced in the Deluge. In 1655, the much-smaller Lithuanian army was incapable of defending the Lithuanian capital of Vilnius against Muscovite attack. This was the first time that Vilnius was occupied by a foreign state. The Swedish and Muscovite armies together occupied large parts of Lithuania. Nevertheless, Lithuania succeeded in holding out and liberated Vilnius, Kaunas, Samogitia and the eastern Voivodeships, except for Smolensk Voivodeship and other parts. Militarily-speaking, the Grand Duchy of Lithuania was weakening.

18th century 
During the Great Northern War, the Grand Ducal Lithuanian Army was no longer defending the country and the Lithuanian magnates' private armies supported different sides. Throughout the 18th century, there were many confederations in the Polish–Lithuanian Commonwealth, which sought different political goals. The Bar Confederation (1768–1772), which happened partly in Lithuania, was an attempt to stem the increasing Imperial Russian influence. Following this failed attempt, the First Partition of the Polish-Lithuanian Commonwealth happened. In the face of the possible loss of independence, military reforms were implemented during the Four Years' Sejm (1788–1792), during which the Lithuanian army significantly expanded, reaching the strength 17,500, and being ready for battle. Regardless, the attempts were unsuccessful in making the Commonwealth's armies match those of the neighbouring absolute monarchies and, following the unsuccessful War of 1792, there was the Second Partition.

The Polish and Lithuanian armies put up a spirited fight against the Imperial Russian Army and the Prussian Army in the Kościuszko Uprising. In addition to regular forces, many quickly-formed units fought also, e.g. Vilnius National Guard and many irregular units. In the end, the Uprising was defeated and much of the remaining part of the Grand Ducal Lithuanian Army was killed in the Battle of Praga on 4 November 1794. With the uprising defeated, the Grand Duchy of Lithuania, together with the Kingdom of Poland, were ended with the Third Partition, with their respective armies being disbanded.

Interwar and post-war periods

After Lithuania's restoration on 16 February 1918, the country immediately began creating their army. The Ministry of Defence's first order was issued on 23 November 1918 and this date is considered the establishment day of the modern Lithuanian Armed Forces. The newly formed army almost immediately fought three wars of independence. Having won the Lithuanian–Soviet War and the war against the Bermontians, it was defeated in the Polish–Lithuanian War. By the end of 1920, the Lithuanian army had over 41 thousand troops. In interwar, the armour equipment primarily consisted of light tanks and tankettes: British Carden Loyd tankette, French Renault FT-17, Swedish Landsverk-182, German Ehrhardt E-V/4. In 1935, the country opened an advanced military research laboratory, specialising in chemical materials for ammunition as well as defense against chemical warfare. The construction of the laboratory was supervised by Juozas Vėbra. In 1940, Lithuania had a considerable Air Force, consisting of 118 aircraft with about half of them designed and produced locally. During the World War II, Lithuania was invaded by both Nazis and Soviets, which eventually concluded in Soviet occupation. The Lithuanian Armed Forces were transformed into the Lithuanian People's Army in 1940 by the People's Government of Lithuania. Despite Soviet repressions, there was a considerable armed Lithuanian resistance which lasted until the 1950s.

Restoration and NATO

Following the restoration of independence, the modern armed forces were formally restored on 25 April 1990 with the establishment of the Department of National Defence. After the January Events, the Voluntary National Defence Service was formed from lightly armed volunteers. The Lithuanian Armed Forces were officially restored on 19 November 1992. Western European countries, especially Sweden, helped to form the initial force by selling or donating excess equipment. However, soon Lithuania started modernising its military, becoming the first European country to acquire US-made FGM-148 Javelin systems in 2001, followed by the FIM-92 Stinger purchase in 2002.

Lithuania applied for NATO membership in 1994 and eventually joined the alliance in 2004. It has since modernised its Armed Forces and has participated in many international missions, including the NATO-led mission in Afghanistan and others.

Organization 

The President of Lithuania is the commander-in-chief of the Lithuanian Armed Forces according to the Constitution of Lithuania. Ministry of National Defence is directly responsible for the organisation of the defence system. Chief of Defence is subordinate to the Minister of National Defence. Defence Staff of the Armed Forces is responsible for the preparation of defence and mobilisation plans.

The Lithuanian Armed Forces consist of the Lithuanian Land Force, Lithuanian Air Force, Lithuanian Naval Force, Lithuanian Special Operations Force and other units: Logistics Command, Training and Doctrine Command, Headquarters Battalion, Military Police. Directly subordinated to the Chief of Defence are the Special Operations Force and Military Police. The Reserve Forces are under command of the Lithuanian National Defence Volunteer Forces.

Lithuanian Riflemen's Union is a paramilitary organization that cooperates with the Armed Forces, but it is not part of them. However, during the state of war, its armed formations fall under the command of the Armed Forces. The same applies to the State Border Guard Service and the Public Security Service.

Lithuanian Land Force

The core of the Lithuanian Land Force structure is the Mechanised Infantry Brigade Iron Wolf (MIB "Iron Wolf") consisting of four mechanized infantry battalions and an artillery battalion. It is supported by the Žemaitija Motorized infantry Brigade which has three battalions and one artillery battalion as well. The third, Aukštaitija Light Infantry Brigade, is a reserve formation with active training. Its command, signal and logistic units are manned by professional soldiers. Volunteer Forces form another brigade-size force, consisting of six territorial units. Other auxiliary units include Juozas Vitkus Engineer Battalion and Juozas Lukša Land Force Training Center.

The Lithuanian Land forces use equipment compatible with the NATO standards. Since 2007, the standard assault rifle is German Heckler & Koch G36. Units are supplied with modern variants of anti-tank weapons (M72 LAW, Carl Gustaf, AT4, FGM-148 Javelin) as well as man-portable air-defense systems (PZR Grom, RBS-70, FIM-92 Stinger). Modern armoured equipment includes: Oshkosh L-ATV armoured cars, Boxer infantry fighting vehicles (local designation IVF "Vilkas") armed with Spike-LR anti-tank missiles and PzH 2000 self-propelled howitzers. The Lithuanian Land forces have been carrying out major modernization with more new weapons and heavier armour being acquired.

Lithuania has been restructuring the armed forces so that one-tenth of the Land Forces could at any given time be deployed for international operations, while half of the Land Forces would be prepared to be deployed outside Lithuania's borders. The volunteers have already successfully participated in international operations in the Balkans, Afghanistan and Iraq.

Lithuanian Air Force

The Lithuanian Air Force (LAF) is an integral part of the Lithuanian Armed Forces. The LAF is formed by professional military servicemen and non-military personnel. Units are located at various bases across Lithuania:
Kaunas (Headquarters and the Airspace Surveillance and Control Command);
Karmėlava (Air Space Control Centre);
Nemirseta (providing basing for sea search and rescue detachment);
Šiauliai (Zokniai Air Base, Air Force Armament and Equipment Repair Depot);
Radviliškis (Air Defence Battalion).

The initial formation of the LAF was the 2nd transport squadron with the transfer of 20 An-2 aircraft from civilian to military use, with initial basing at the Barysiai Airport on 27 April 1992. These were joined by four L-39C Albatros aircraft to be used by the 1st fighter (training) squadron. These were in addition to Mil Mi-8 helicopters and a short-range transport aircraft L-410, all of which went through a capital overhaul, upgrade and modernisation in the 2000s.

Following the initial acquisitions, the LAF began its aircraft's modernisation by ordering three C-27J Spartan transporters in 2006. In 2013, three Eurocopter AS365 Dauphin helicopters were acquired from France and, in 2020, Lithuania announced an order or four Sikorsky UH-60 Black Hawk helicopters from the USA. Simultaneously, new medium-range and long-range radars were acquired for the Airspace Surveillance and Control Command.

Air space is patrolled by jet fighters from other NATO members and they are based in Zokniai Air Base, near the city of Šiauliai (see Baltic Air Policing). The external border of the European Union (with Kaliningrad and Belarus) is patrolled by the Aviation Unit of the Lithuanian State Border Guard Service which, since the 2000s, uses helicopters EC-120, EC-135 and EC-145.

Lithuanian Navy

The Navy has over 600 personnel. The Navy consists of the Warship Flotilla, the Sea Coastal Surveillance System, the Explosive Ordnance Disposal (EOD) Divers Team, the Naval Logistic Service, Training Center and Maritime Rescue Coordination Center. The flotilla is the core component of the Navy and consists of the Mine Countermeasures Squadron, the Patrol Ships Squadron, and the Harbour Boats Group. The current Commander in Chief of the Lithuanian Navy is Rear Admiral Kęstutis Macijauskas. The Naval base and Headquarters are located in the city of Klaipėda. The Navy uses patrol ships for coastal surveillance.

The four newly acquired s replaced the older s and s.

Special Operations Force

The Lithuanian Special Operations Force of Lithuanian Armed Forces has been in operation de facto since 2002 and it was established de jure on 3 April 2008, when amendments of National Defence System organisation and military service law came into force. The Special Operations Force is formed from the Special Operations Unit.

The Special Operations Force is responsible for special reconnaissance, direct actions, and military support. It is also in charge of other tasks, e.g., protection of VIPs in peacetime. Its core is based on the Special Purpose Service, Vytautas the Great Jaeger Battalion and Combat Divers Service. Lithuanian Air Force Special Operations Element is subordinate to the Unit at the level of operations management. Its structure is flexible which makes it easy to form squadrons intended for concrete operations and missions from its elements. The Special Operations Force can be called upon inside the territory of Lithuania when law enforcement agencies lack or do not have the necessary capabilities to react to terrorist attacks. The capabilities of special forces make them the main national response force responsible for counter-terrorism operations and operations to prevent violations of sovereignty.

The Special Operations Force Squadron "Aitvaras" was deployed to Afghanistan on the Operation Enduring Freedom. From 2005 to 2006 its squadrons were on standby in NATO Response Force.

International cooperation

Lithuania has been a member of NATO military alliance since 2004. In the European Union, Lithuanian Armed Forces have also taken part in the Nordic Battle Group since 2008. Lithuanian Armed Forces also participate in the UK Joint Expeditionary Force formed in 2014.

In 2009, to encourage regional cooperation, Lithuania joined the initiative to form the Lithuanian–Polish–Ukrainian Brigade.

NATO membership

Soon after the restoration of independence, Lithuania applied for NATO membership in January 1994. Together with another six Central and Eastern European countries, Lithuania was invited to join the North Atlantic Treaty Organization in the 2002 Prague summit and became a member of the Alliance in March 2004. Lithuania entered NATO on full-fledged rights immediately after the procedures of joining the North Atlantic Treaty were completed and acquired rights to participate in the political decision-making process of the Alliance. Integration into the military structures of NATO became a long-term task of the Lithuanian Armed Forces. Mechanised Infantry Brigade "Iron Wolf" was affiliated to the Danish Division based on agreements signed by Denmark and Lithuania in August 2006. Lithuanian Armed Forces started to boost the Brigade's ability to cooperate with the forces of other NATO members.

Baltic Air Policing was established by NATO allies since Lithuania and the other Baltic states do not have capabilities to secure their airspace. Fighter jets of NATO members are permanently deployed in Zokniai airport near the city Šiauliai to provide cover for the Baltic states airspace. In 2013, NATO Energy Security Centre of Excellence was established in Vilnius.

Following the 2016 Warsaw summit, NATO Enhanced Forward Presence was deployed in the Baltic States with the multinational battalion battle group in Lithuania being led by Germany.

Cooperation between the Baltic States

Lithuania also cooperates with the two other Baltic states – Latvia and Estonia in several trilateral Baltic defence co-operation initiatives:
 Baltic Battalion (BALTBAT) – infantry battalion for participation in international peace support operations, headquartered near Riga, Latvia;
 Baltic Naval Squadron (BALTRON) – naval force with mine countermeasures capabilities, headquartered near Tallinn, Estonia;
 Baltic Air Surveillance Network (BALTNET) – air surveillance information system, headquartered near Kaunas, Lithuania;
 Joint military educational institutions: Baltic Defence College (BALTDEFCOL) in Tartu, Estonia, Baltic Diving Training Centre in Liepāja, Latvia and Baltic Naval Communications Training Centre in Tallinn, Estonia.
In January 2011, the Baltic states were invited to join Nordic Defence Cooperation, the defence framework of the Nordic countries. In November 2012, the three countries agreed to create a joint military staff in 2013. Future co-operation will include sharing of national infrastructures for training purposes and specialisation of training areas (BALTTRAIN) and collective formation of battalion-sized contingents for use in the NATO rapid-response force.

Foreign missions and operations

Lithuanian soldiers have taken part in international operations since 1993. From the summer of 2005 until 2014, Lithuania has been part of the International Security Assistance Force in Afghanistan (ISAF), leading a Provincial Reconstruction Team (PRT) in the town of Chaghcharan in the province of Ghor. The PRT included personnel from Denmark, Iceland and the US. There have also been special operation forces units in Afghanistan. They were placed in Kandahar province.

Since joining international operations in 1993, Lithuania has lost two soldiers. 1st Lt. Normundas Valteris fell in Bosnia (17 April 1996), Sgt. Arūnas Jarmalavičius in Afghanistan (22 May 2008).

Current operations (in 2022)

List of military equipment

Conscription

In May 2015, the Lithuanian parliament voted to return the conscription and the conscripts started their training in August 2015. This was after the Crimean Crisis, which heightened international tensions and thus ended the brief respite of seven years when Lithuania abolished its conscription in 2008.

Ranks

See also
 Equipment of the Lithuanian Land Force
 Baltic Air Policing
 NATO Enhanced Forward Presence

Notes 

a. The 23,000 is structured like this: 14,500 in the Army, 1,500 in the Air Force, 700 in the Navy, and 6,300 in other units. The other units includes the Logistics Support Command (1,400), Training and Doctrine Command  (1,500), the Special Operations Force (unknown) as well as the battalions of HQ and Military Police (2,600).

b.  The paramilitary includes 10,600 of the Riflemen's Union and 3,550 of the State Border Guard Service.

c. The number of 1.05 billion is without including military pensions. When the military pensions are included, the military budget reaches 1.12 billion.

Citations

Sources

Further reading
 The Military Strategy of the Republic of Lithuania
 Stefan Marx, 'Lithuania's Defence Structure,' Jane's Intelligence Review, September 1993, p. 407–409

External links

 
 Official Ministry of National Defence Republic of Lithuania website
 Official Joint Headquarters of Lithuanian Armed Forces website
 Official YouTube channel of Lithuanian Armed Forces
 Official NATO Energy Security Center of Excellence website
 Official General Jonas Žemaitis Military Academy of Lithuania website

 
Permanent Structured Cooperation